G patch domain-containing protein 8 is a protein that in humans is encoded by the GPATCH8 gene.

Hyperuricemia
Hyperuricemia cosegregating with osteogenesis imperfecta has been shown to be associated with a mutation in GPATCH8 using exome sequencing

References

Further reading